Bellator MMA vs. Rizin FF and Rizin 40 was a mixed martial arts event being co-promoted by Bellator MMA and the Rizin Fighting Federation that took place on December 31, 2022, at the Saitama Super Arena in Saitama, Japan.

Background 
The main card saw fighters from each promotion fight each other, with the Bellator representatives including a current champion and three former champions: Patrício Pitbull, A. J. McKee, Juan Archuleta and Kyoji Horiguchi. Matches were contested under Rizin's ruleset, which differs from Bellator's usual Unified Rules of Mixed Martial Arts.

The main card aired tape delayed in the U.S. on Showtime, Bellator's regular broadcast partner.

Results

See also 

 2022 in Bellator MMA
 2022 in Rizin Fighting Federation
 List of Bellator MMA events

References

External links 
Bellator MMA vs. Rizin - Bellator Sport Worldwide
Rizin 40 - Rizin Fighting Federation

Bellator MMA events
Rizin Fighting Federation
Sport in Saitama (city)
2022 in mixed martial arts
2022 in Japanese sport
Mixed martial arts in Japan
Sports competitions in Japan
December 2022 sports events in Japan